Maureen McGovern is Maureen McGovern's fourth studio album (and her first in four years), released in 1979 on Curb Records. It reached #162 on the Billboard Hot 200 list of popular albums.

This album contains McGovern's movie theme ("Can You Read My Mind," the love theme from the 1978 film Superman) and "Different Worlds," the theme from the TV series Angie, which peaked at #1 for two weeks on the Adult Contemporary chart and #18 on the Billboard Hot 100 chart in 1979. It shows a new image that McGovern created for herself; she had her long blonde hair cut short and dyed it brown (she would change her image a few more times over the years, particularly during the 1980s). It was also McGovern's last album to concentrate on pop music and movie themes, as she would soon quit this work to begin a career on Broadway; she returned to the music industry a few years later as a singer of standards and showtunes.

Cover versions include Frankie Valli's "Can't Take My Eyes Off You," the Beatles' "I'm Happy Just to Dance with You," the Crystals' hit "He's a Rebel" (written by Gene Pitney), Barbara Mason's "Yes, I'm Ready", and the standard Carolina Moon". (In 1980, McGovern continued to record for Curb Records, releasing the singles "We Could Have It All," which reached #16 on the U.S. AC charts and #6 on the Canadian AC charts, as well as "Bottom Line," but no follow-up album on Curb was ever released.)

In 1990, Curb Records released this album on CD, but replaced the fan favorite album cut "Life's a Long Way To Run" with the hit "The Morning After" and re-titled the CD "Greatest Hits".

Track listing

Album credits
Produced and engineered by: Michael Lloyd
Arranged by: John D'Andrea
Tracks engineered by: Humberto Gatica and Michael Lloyd
Second engineer: Jim Crosby
Mastered: Bob McCloud at Artisan
Musician contracting: Shaun Harris
Background vocals: The Pearl Divers
Management: Marcia Day, Day 5 Productions
Art direction: Peter Whorf
Design: Brad Kanawyer
Photography: Luis Lizarraga

Charts

References

1979 albums
Maureen McGovern albums
20th Century Fox Records albums